Club Africain (Arabic: النادي الافريقي, English:  African Club) is a Tunisian handball team based in Capital Tunis, that plays in Tunisian Professional Handball League.

Honours

National titles
 Tunisian Handball League 13 :
Champions : 1964–65, 1967–68, 1969–70, 1985–86, 1986–87, 1988–89, 1989–90, 1997–98, 1999–2000, 2000–01, 2007–08, 2014–15, 2021-22

 Tunisian Handball Cup 19 :
Champions : 1963–64, 1964–65, 1965–66, 1966–67, 1967–68, 1968–69, 1986–87, 1987–88, 1988–89, 1995–96, 1996–97, 1997–98, 2000–01, 2002–03, 2003–04, 2006–07, 2010–11, 2014–15, 2015–16

International titles
 African Handball Champions League 1 :

Champions : 2014
Runners Up : 2015

 African Handball Cup Winners' Cup 5 :

Champions : 2001, 2004, 2005, 2007, 2008

 African Handball Super Cup 1 :

Champions : 2015
Runners Up : 2002, 2005, 2006

Regional titles
 Arab Handball Championship of Champions 2 :

Champions : 1986, 2012

 Arab Handball Championship of Winners' Cup 2 :

Champions : 1999, 2002
Runners Up : 2001

 Double
 Winners (7): 1964–65, 1967–68, 1986–87, 1988–89, 1997–98, 2000–01, 2014–15

Team

Current squad

Notable players
  Oualid Ben Amor
  Aymen Hammed
  Hafedh Zouabi
  Oussama Boughanmi
  Amine Bannour
  Abdelhak Ben Salah
  Riadh Sanaa
  Ali Madi

See also
Club Africain (football)
Club Africain (basketball)
Club Africain Women's Handball

References

External links
Official website
Handball Page 
Club Africain on Instagram

Tunisian handball clubs
Handball clubs established in 1956
1956 establishments in Tunisia
Sport in Tunis